Marjorie Daw (born Marguerite E. House; January 19, 1902 – March 18, 1979) was an American film actress of the silent film era. She appeared in more than 70 films between 1914 and 1929.

Career
Born in Colorado Springs, Colorado, Daw was the daughter of John H. House. She took her stage name from Marjorie Daw, a short story by Thomas Bailey Aldrich. Daw began acting as a teen to support her younger brother and herself after the death of their parents. She made her film debut in 1914 and worked steadily during the 1920s. She retired from acting after the advent of sound film.

Personal life and death
Daw married director Alfred Edward Sutherland on April 20, 1923, in Beverly Hills; They had no children, and they divorced in 1925. On January 23, 1929, Daw married Myron Selznick in New York City. They had a daughter, Joan, and were divorced on April 3, 1942.

Daw died on March 18, 1979, in Huntington Beach, California, aged 77.

Filmography

References

External links

Marjorie Daw on the cover of MOVIE WEEKLY magazine, August 29, 1925 (archived)

Further reading
 

1902 births
1979 deaths
Actresses from Colorado Springs, Colorado
American child actresses
American film actresses
American silent film actresses
20th-century American actresses